The SMD ST1080 is a HMD manufactured by SiliconMicroDisplay, which supports a native 1080p resolution. Utilizing two displays, it can be used for stereoscopic viewing of 3D video, allowing resolutions/frame-rates like 24Hz full resolution (frame packing), or 60 Hz half-resolution (side-by-side, top-bottom).

The device needs an external power source, connected via the Micro USB port. Reviews claim that the PC power output will be enough, removing the need for a battery pack or wall charger.

External links 
 

Display technology
Eyewear
Virtual reality